The following is a list of National Public Radio personnel:

Leadership
John Lansing, president and CEO 
Jarl Mohn, president emeritus, board member of NPR Foundation, and co-chair of NPR's 50th anniversary capital campaign. 
 Paul G. Haaga, Jr., chair of the board of directors
 Howard Wollner, president of the NPR Foundation
 Christopher Turpin, Acting Senior Vice President, News, and Editorial Director
 Stacey Foxwell, vice president of operations
 Sarah Gilbert, acting vice president for news programming and operations

News hosts 
Melissa Block – Special Correspondent and former Host, All Things Considered
Ailsa Chang – Co-Host, All Things Considered, Culver City, California
Leila Fadel – Co-Host, Morning Edition
Steve Inskeep – Co-Host, Morning Edition, Washington, D.C.
Mary Louise Kelly – Co-Host, All Things Considered
Michel Martin – Weekend Host, All Things Considered
Rachel Martin – Co-Host, Morning Edition
A Martínez – Co-Host, Morning Edition, Culver City, California
Renée Montagne – Special Correspondent/ former Host, Morning Edition
Tonya Mosley – Co-Host, Here and Now, Culver City, California
Lisa Mullins – Guest Host, Here and Now
Peter O'Dowd – Guest Host, Here and Now
Ayesha Rascoe – Host, Weekend Edition Sunday,  Co-Host NPR Sunday Puzzle
Ari Shapiro – Co-Host, All Things Considered
Robert Siegel – Former Host, All Things Considered - retired January 2018
Scott Simon – Host, Weekend Edition Saturday
Juana Summers – Co-Host, All Things Considered
Robin Young – Co-Host, Here and Now

Syndicated hosts 
Rund Abdelfatah – Co-Host, Throughline
Ramtin Arablouei – Co-Host, Throughline
Amanda Aronczyk – Co-Host/ Reporter, Planet Money
David Bianculli – TV Critic/ Guest Host, Fresh Air
Bob Boilen – Host, All Songs Considered
Meghna Chakrabarti – Host, On Point
Mary Childs – Co-Host/ Reporter, Planet Money
Felix Contreras – Host, Alt.Latino
Dave Davies – Guest Host, Fresh Air
Gene Demby – Co-Host/ Correspondent, Code Switch
Raina Douris – Host, World Cafe
Karen Duffin – Co-Host/ Reporter, Planet Money
Cardiff Garcia – Co-Host, The Indicator from Planet Money
Jacob Goldstein –Co-Host/ Correspondent, Planet Money
Sarah Gonzalez –Co-Host/ Reporter, Planet Money
Terry Gross – Host, Fresh Air
Aisha Harris – Co-Host, Pop Culture Happy Hour
Robin Hilton – Host, All Songs Considered
Maria Hinojosa – Host, Latino USA
Linda Holmes – Co-Host, Pop Culture Happy Hour
Kamilah Kashanie – Host, StoryCorps Podcast
Bill Littlefield – Host, Only A Game
Tom and Ray Magliozzi – Former Hosts, Car Talk
Christian McBride – Host, Jazz Night in America
Kelly McEvers – Host, Embedded
Kia Miaka Natisse – Co-Host, Invisibilia
Christopher O'Riley – Host, From the Top
Guy Raz – Host, How I Built This
Fiona Ritchie – Host, The Thistle & Shamrock
Peter Sagal – Host, Wait Wait... Don't Tell Me
Sam Sanders – Correspondent/ Host, It's Been a Minute with Sam Sanders
Yowei Shaw – Co-Host, Invisibilia
Madeline K. Sofia – Host, Short Wave
Stacey Vanek Smith – Co-Host, The Indicator from Planet Money
Stephen Thompson – Co-Host, Pop Culture Happy Hour
Gregory Warner – Host, Rough Translation
Glen Weldon – Co-Host, Pop Culture Happy Hour
Jenn White – Host, 1A
Manoush Zomordi – Host, TED Radio Hour

NPR News

Correspondents and reporters

Washington Desk 

 Ximena Bustillo - Multiplatform Reporter, Washington Desk
 Susan Davis – Congressional Correspondent
 Scott Detrow – White House Correspondent
 Ron Elving – Senior Editor/ Correspondent, Washington Desk
 Don Gonyea – National Political Correspondent
 Claudia Grisales – Congressional Reporter
 Carrie Johnson – Justice Correspondent
 Tamara Keith – White House Correspondent
 Asma Khalid – White House Correspondent
 Michele Kelemen – Correspondent, State Department
 Danielle Kurtzleben – Political Reporter
 Mara Liasson – National Political Correspondent
 Ryan Lucas – Justice Correspondent
 Tim Mak – Investigative Correspondent, Washington Desk
 Domenico Montanaro – Senior Political Editor/ Correspondent, Washington Desk
 Greg Myre – Correspondent, National Security
 Brian Naylor – Correspondent, Washington Desk
 Franco Ordoñez – White House Correspondent
 Miles Parks – Reporter, Voting and Elections
 Deepa Shivaram - Multiplatform Reporter, Washington Desk
 Kelsey Snell – Congressional Correspondent
 Barbara Sprunt – Congressional Reporter
 Nina Totenberg – Correspondent, Legal Affairs, Washington Desk
 Deirdre Walsh – Congress Editor/ Acting Congressional Correspondent
 David Welna – Correspondent, Washington Desk

National Desk 

 Noah Adams – Contributing Correspondent, National Desk
 Greg Allen – Correspondent, National Desk, Miami
 Chris Arnold – Correspondent, National Desk, Boston
 Tom Bowman – Pentagon Reporter, National Desk, Washington
 Jeff Brady – Reporter, National Desk
 John Burnett – Correspondent, National Desk, Austin, Texas
 Cheryl Corley – Correspondent, National Desk, Chicago
 Camila Domonoske – Reporter, National Desk
 Debbie Elliott – Correspondent, National Desk
 Adrian Florido – Correspondent, National Desk
 Jasmine Garsd – Correspondent, National Desk
 Wade Goodwyn – Correspondent, National Desk, Dallas
 Richard Gonzales – Correspondent, National Desk, San Francisco
 Sally Herships – Freelance Reporter
 Ina Jaffe – Correspondent, National Desk, Culver City, CA
 Martin Kaste – Law Enforcement Correspondent, National Desk, Seattle
 Quil Lawrence – Veterans Correspondent, New York
 Brian Mann – Correspondent, Addiction Issues
Sarah McCammon – Correspondent, National Desk/ Guest Host
Joel Rose – Correspondent, Immigration, National Desk
Nathan Rott – Correspondent, Environment and the American West, National Desk
David Schaper – Reporter, National Desk, Chicago
Kirk Siegler – Correspondent, National Desk, Boise
Tovia Smith – Correspondent, National Desk, Boston
Hansi Lo Wang – Correspondent, National Desk
Eric Westervelt –Correspondent, National Desk, San Francisco

International Desk 

 Deborah Amos – International Correspondent
 Jane Arraf – International Correspondent, Cairo
 Eleanor Beardsley – International Correspondent, Paris
 Daniel Estrin – International Correspondent, Jerusalem
Emily Feng – International Correspondent, Beijing
Alice Fordham – Freelance International Correspondent, Beirut
Lauren Frayer – International Correspondent, Mumbai
Diaa Hadid – International Correspondent, Islamabad
Carrie Kahn – International Correspondent, Mexico City
Joanna Kakissis – International Contributor, Athens
Peter Kenyon – International Correspondent, Istanbul
Anthony Kuhn – Foreign Correspondent, Beijing
Frank Langfitt – International Correspondent, London
Charles Maynes – International Correspondent, Moscow
Julie McCarthy – International Correspondent, Southeast Asia
Jackie Northam – Correspondent, International Affairs
John Otis – Freelance Reporter, Bogotá
Eyder Peralta – International Correspondent, East Africa
Sylvia Poggioli – Senior European Correspondent, Foreign Desk
Ofeibea Quist-Arcton – International Correspondent, Dakar
Philip Reeves – International Correspondent, South America
John Ruwitch – Reporter, U.S.- China Relations
Rob Schmitz – International Correspondent, Berlin
Ruth Sherlock – International Correspondent, Lebanon
Teri Schultz – Freelance International Reporter, Brussels
Michael Sullivan – International Correspondent, Senior Asia Correspondent

Arts Desk 

 Elizabeth Blair – Senior Producer/ Reporter, Arts Desk
Eric Deggans – TV Critic
 Mandalit del Barco – Reporter, Arts Desk, Culver City, CA
 Andrew Limbong – Reporter, Arts Desk
 Jeff Lunden – Freelance Arts Reporter
Bob Mondello – Movie Critic
Ann Powers – Music Critic

Anastasia Tsioulcas – Reporter, Arts Desk
Neda Ulaby – Reporter, Arts Desk

Business Desk 

 Bobby Allyn – Technology Reporter, San Francisco
 Sabri Ben-Achour - Correspondent, New York
 Uri Berliner – Senior Business Editor
 Shannon Bond – Technology Correspondent, San Francisco
 David Gura – Correspondent
 Scott Horsley – Chief Economics Correspondent
 Andrea Hsu – Labor and Workplace Correspondent
 Yuki Noguchi – Correspondent, Business Desk
 Alina Selyukh – Correspondent, Business Desk
 Jim Zarroli – Reporter, Business, New York

Science Desk 

 Nurith Aizenman – Correspondent, Global Health and International Development
 Allison Aubrey – Correspondent, Science Desk
 Jason Beaubien – Correspondent, Global Health and Development
 Geoff Brumfiel – Senior Editor/ Correspondent, Science Desk
 Dan Charles – Food and Agriculture Correspondent, Science Desk
 Rhitu Chatterjee – Correspondent, Health
 Michaeleen Doucleff – Reporter, Science Desk
 Maria Godoy – Senior Editor/ Correspondent, Science Desk
 Nell Greenfieldboyce – Reporter, Science Desk
 Jon Hamilton – Correspondent, Science Desk
 Pien Huang – Reporter, Science Desk
 Rebecca Hersher – Reporter, Science Desk
 Christopher Joyce – Correspondent, Science Desk
Jennifer Ludden – Energy and Environment Editor
 Sydney Lupkin – Correspondent, Pharmaceuticals
 Joe Palca – Correspondent, Science Desk
 Selena Simmons-Duffin – Reporter, Health Policy
 Lauren Sommer – Correspondent, Science Desk
 Rob Stein – Senior Editor/ Correspondent, Science Desk
 Will Stone – Reporter, Health

Planet Money 

 Sally Helm – Reporter, Planet Money
 Kenny Malone – Correspondent, Planet Money
 Keith Romer – Contributing Reporter, Planet Money
Greg Rosalsky – Reporter, Planet Money
Robert Smith – Correspondent, Planet Money

Code Switch 

 Karen Grigsby Bates – Senior Correspondent, Code Switch

Investigations Unit 

 Tom Dreisbach – Correspondent, Investigations
 Sacha Pfeiffer – Correspondent, Investigations/ Guest Host
 Joseph Shapiro – Correspondent, Investigations
 Laura Sullivan – Correspondent, Investigations
 Dina Temple-Raston – Correspondent, Investigations
Cheryl W. Thompson – Correspondent, Investigations

Other 

 David Folkenflik – Media Correspondent
 Tom Goldman – Correspondent, Sports
 Anya Kamenetz – Correspondent, Education
Kat Lonsdorf – Reporter
 Jenna McLaughlin – Cybersecurity Correspondent
 Elissa Nadworny – Reporter, Education
 Jerome Socolovsky – Audio Storytelling Specialist, NPR Training
 Susan Stamberg – Special Correspondent
 Cory Turner – Senior Editor/ Correspondent, NPR Ed Team
 Linda Wertheimer – Senior National Correspondent
 Odette Yousef – National Security Correspondent (focus on extremism)

Breaking News Reporters 

 Jaclyn Diaz – Reporter
 Jonathan Franklin – Reporter
Joe Hernandez – Reporter
 Vanessa Romo – Reporter
 Laurel Wamsley – Reporter

Newscast Unit 

 Dwane Brown – Newscaster (Weekdays, All Things Considered interludes)
Korva Coleman – Newscaster (Weekdays, 6AM-11AM)
Amy Held – Newscasts Editor; Fill-In Newscaster
Jeanine Herbst – Newscaster (Weekends, 5PM-10PM)
Windsor Johnston – Newscaster
Barbara Klein – Newscaster (Weekends, 11AM-4PM)
Lori Lundin – Freelance Newscaster
Dave Mattingly – Newscaster (Weekdays, 5AM/ Morning Edition interludes)
Nora Raum – Newscaster (Weekends, 11PM-4AM)
Louise Schiavone – Freelance Newscaster
Lakshmi Singh – Newscaster (Weekdays, 12PM-4PM)
Giles Snyder – Newscaster (Weekends, 5AM-10AM)
Jack Speer – Newscaster (Weekdays, 5PM-10PM)
Shay Stevens – Newscaster (Weekdays, 11PM-4AM)
Dale Willman – Freelance Newscaster
Doualy Xaykaothao – Fill-In Newscaster

References

External links
NPR website

NPR
NPR